U Equulei (U Equ / IRAS 20547 +0247) is a variable star in the Equuleus constellation with an apparent magnitude of +14.50 in the B band. It lies at an estimated distance of 5,000 light-years (1,500 parsecs ) from the Solar System.

Properties 
U Equulei is, or was, an OH/IR star, and strong OH and H2O masers have been observed.  These vary to a greater extent than almost any other star observed, and it is possible that the stage of maser activity is essentially finished.

Theoretical Planet 
Lionel Siess and Mario Livio suggested that the accretion of a giant planet towards the increasing red giant has made the star's outer layers rotate fast enough to cause an outpouring equatorial- or disk-expansion, responsible for the star's peculiar environment. The spectroscopic study has indicated the star is surrounded by the dust shell, but shape of the shell cannot be measured due to large distance to the star.

See also 
List of stars in Equuleus

References 

K-type giants
Equuleus
Slow irregular variables
Equulei, U
J20571628+0258445
G-type giants
IRAS catalogue objects